The common table prayer is probably the best known mealtime prayer among North American Lutherans.  Several other variations also exist.

History 
The common table prayer was first published in the year 1753 in a Moravian hymnal, Etwas vom Liede Mosis, des Knechts Gottes, und dem Liede des Lammes, das ist: Alt- und neuer Brüder-Gesang.  The title was Tisch-Gebetgen, or Table Prayer.  There are possibilities that the prayer is from an older text with Lutheran origins.  In the Moravian hymnal the prayer is not placed in the "Old Moravian Hymns" chapter or in the eighteenth-century Moravian hymns" chapter.  Instead it is placed in the chapter titled "evangelical hymns from the seventeenth century".  Dietrich Meyer put as author of the prayer "author unknown".  In the Evangelisch-Lutherisher Gebets-Schatz or Evangelical-Lutheran Prayer Treasures, the prayer is attributed to Martin Luther, but this is highly speculative.

Text 
Original German:
Komm, Herr Jesu; sei du unser Gast;
und segne, was du uns bescheret hast.

English:
Come, Lord Jesus, be our Guest;
And bless what you have bestowed. 
or alternatively, a Moravian translation,

Come, Lord, Jesus, our Guest to be
And bless these gifts bestowed by Thee.

There are several variations common today for the second line.  In English there are other second lines such as "Let these gifts to us be blessed," "Let Thy gifts to us be blessed," "Let these Thy gifts to us be blessed," "Let these foods to us be blessed," "And let this food by Thee be blessed, "let these gifts to us be blessed and may our souls by thee be fed ever on the living bread," and "and bless what you have bestowed to us out of mercy", and "Bless us and everything Thou hast set before us."  Also in German there are several other versions such as "und segne, was du uns bescheret hast," and "und segne, was du uns aus Gnaden bescheret hast".  A second "verse" may also be added:  "Blessed be God who is our bread; may all the world be clothed and fed."  Moravians often add "Bless our loved ones everywhere and keep them in Thy loving care."

Sometimes the verse of Psalm 136:1 is added at the end. "O give thanks unto/to the Lord, for He is good: For His mercy/love endureth/endures forever." This part of the prayer is prayed either right after the first part of the prayer before a meal or separately from the first part of the prayer at the end of a meal.

See also 
Christian child's prayer
Lutheranism

External links 
WELS-Prayers, the Common Table Prayer
LCMS-The Lutheran Witness, Come, Lord Jesus

Christian prayer
Lutheran liturgy and worship